Edward Joseph Mulligan (August 27, 1894 – March 15, 1982), born in St. Louis, Missouri, was a third baseman for the Chicago Cubs (1915–16), Chicago White Sox (1921-22) and Pittsburgh Pirates (1928). He went to school at Saint Louis University.

He led the American League in outs (508) in 1921.

In 5 seasons he played in 350 Games and had 1,235 at-bats, 143 runs, 287 hits, 41 doubles, 24 triples, 1 home run, 88 RBIs, 23 stolen bases, 70 walks, .232 batting average, .278 On-base percentage, .307 slugging percentage, 379 total bases and 76 sacrifice hits.

In 1939 he was the manager of the Salt Lake City Bees in the Pioneer Baseball League.

In 1964 he was presented with the King of Baseball award given by Minor League Baseball.

He died in San Rafael, California at the age of 87.

Sources

1894 births
1982 deaths
Major League Baseball third basemen
Chicago Cubs players
Chicago White Sox players
Pittsburgh Pirates players
Baseball players from St. Louis
Minor league baseball managers
Davenport Blue Sox players
Ottumwa Packers players
Rock Island Islanders players
Galesburg Pavers players
Kansas City Blues (baseball) players
Mobile Sea Gulls players
Salt Lake City Bees players
San Francisco Seals (baseball) players
Mission Reds players
Seattle Indians players
Portland Beavers players
Oakland Oaks (baseball) players
Hollywood Stars players
San Diego Padres (minor league) players
Sportspeople from San Rafael, California
Saint Louis University alumni